Jimmi José Briceño Castro (born 15 April 1986) is a Venezuelan road cyclist.

He was suspended for doping for the 2014 and 2015 seasons.

Major results

2007
 1st  Young rider classification Vuelta a Venezuela
2008
 1st Stage Vuelta a Trujillo
2010
 1st  Overall Vuelta a Trujillo
1st Stages 1 & 3
 1st Stage 11 Vuelta al Táchira
2011
 1st Stage 4 Vuelta a Trujillo
 5th Overall Vuelta Ciclista Chiapas
 8th Overall Vuelta a Bolivia
2012
 1st  Overall Vuelta al Táchira
1st  Points classification
1st Stage 8
2017
 2nd Overall Vuelta al Táchira
1st Stage 9
2019
 1st  Overall Vuelta al Táchira
1st Stage 6

References

External links

1986 births
Living people
Venezuelan male cyclists
People from Barinas (state)